The Italian national wheelchair handball team is the national wheelchair handball team of Italy and is controlled by the Italian Handball Association.

Competitive record

European Wheelchair Handball Nations’ Tournament

References

External links 
 Nazionale italiana
EHF Team Page

National wheelchair handball teams
Handball in Italy
Wheelchair handball